Telangana: The State of Affairs is a book edited by M. Bharath Bhushan and N. Venugopal.

Synopsis
The book analyses the issues of regional discrimination, identity and its construction.  It explains rationale for the demand for separate Statehood for Telangana. The book comprises essays by Duncan B. Forrester, N Venugopal, M Bharath Bhushan, Dean E. McHenry Jr., K Naresh Kumar, S V Srinivas, Radhika Rajamani and translation of two short stories by P V Narasimha Rao and Allam Rajayya.

References

Books about politics of India
Telangana movement
2009 non-fiction books
21st-century Indian books